The Bacon-Merchant-Moss House is a historic house located at 32 Cottage Street in Lockport, Niagara County, New York.

Description and history 
It is a two-story, Federal style stone structure built in 1832. A narrow attic crawlspace is believed to have been used to hide slaves escaping to Canada on the Underground Railroad. The YWCA purchased the building in 1927, and it continues to be owned by that organization. It is one of approximately 75 stone residences remaining in the city of Lockport.

It was listed on the National Register of Historic Places on May 30, 2007.

References

External links
Bacon-Merchant-Moss House - Lockport, NY - U.S. National Register of Historic Places on Waymarking.com

Houses on the National Register of Historic Places in New York (state)
Houses completed in 1832
Houses on the Underground Railroad
Houses in Niagara County, New York
National Register of Historic Places in Niagara County, New York
Federal architecture in New York (state)